Edward F. Bramley (1905 – February 1989) was a British communist activist.

Biography
Born in Westminster, while still young, Bramley moved to Detroit with his family, but they returned to London during World War I. Ted became an engineer and joined the Amalgamated Engineering Union.

Bramley's father was a member of the Social Democratic Federation and the Industrial Workers of the World, and Ted joined the Communist Party of Great Britain (CPGB) in 1927.  He rapidly rose through the party, joining the Central Committee in 1932 and attending a Comintern meeting in 1933.  He stood in Hammersmith North at the 1931 general election, and again in a 1934 by-election, but did not come close to election.

Bramley wished to fight in the Spanish Civil War, but the CPGB refused him permission to do so, preferring him to remain in the UK, and appointing him as London District Secretary in 1937. He again hoped to enlist during World War II, but was rejected because he had suffered from tuberculosis.  Instead, he focussed on his party work, leading a movement to occupy London Underground stations during bombing raids.  This work led to his election, in 1946, to the London County Council in Mile End, alongside fellow communist Jack Gaster.

While a councillor, Bramley led a movement to occupy empty luxury flats, in order to house returning service personnel.  He was charged with conspiracy, and received a suspended sentence.  Facing illness, he resigned as London District Secretary in 1947, but continued to stand in elections, failing to hold his council seat in 1949, then standing unsuccessfully in Stepney at the 1951 general election.

Around this time, Bramley retired to Hertfordshire and entered farming, writing on this topic for the Morning Star.

Personal life 
Ted Bramley married Kathleen Margaret Ogilvie (1917-2002) in 1939 and had three children; Ian (1943), Richard (1947) and Glen (1949)

References

1905 births
1989 deaths
Communist Party of Great Britain councillors
English farmers
Members of London County Council
People from Westminster